Kings Pond is a  pond in the West Plymouth section of Plymouth, Massachusetts. The pond is located south of Little West Pond, Micajah Pond and Micajah Heights, and north of Curlew Pond. The water quality is impaired due to non-native aquatic plants.

External links
Environmental Protection Agency

Ponds of Plymouth, Massachusetts
Ponds of Massachusetts